The Game Awards 2018 was an award show that honored the best video games of 2018. It was produced and hosted by Geoff Keighley, creator and producer of The Game Awards, and was held to an invited audience at the Microsoft Theater in Los Angeles on December 6, 2018. The event was live streamed across more than 45 digital platforms. The show featured musical performances from Harry Gregson-Williams, Daniel Lanois, Lena Raine, and Hans Zimmer, and presentations from celebrity guests including Jonah Hill, the Russo brothers, Brendon Urie, and Christoph Waltz. The show opened with a group speech by Nintendo's Reggie Fils-Aimé, PlayStation's Shawn Layden, and Xbox's Phil Spencer, representing the unity of the industry. Keighley began planning for the show immediately after the previous ceremony, and spent months traveling to studios around the world to secure announcements and trailers.

God of War and Red Dead Redemption 2 received eight nominations each, the most in Game Awards history at the time. At the show, Red Dead Redemption 2 tied for the highest-awarded game in the show's history with four wins, and God of War was awarded Game of the Year. Several new games were revealed, including Far Cry New Dawn, Hades, and The Outer Worlds. In association with the event, sales were held on most digital storefronts for nominees and former winners. The 2018 was viewed by over 26.2 million streams, the most in its history to date, with four million concurrent viewers at its peak. It received a generally positive reception from media publications, with praise directed at the opening speech and announcements but some criticism for the focus on reveals over awards.

Background 

As with previous iterations of The Game Awards, the show was hosted and produced by Canadian games journalist Geoff Keighley. He returned as an executive producer alongside Kimmie Kim, and Richard Preuss and LeRoy Bennett returned as director and creative director, respectively. Keighley began working on The Game Awards 2018 immediately after the previous ceremony by conducting a postmortem and booking the Microsoft Theater. He shifted into full work in July 2018 following E3. He spent months traveling to studios around the world to secure announcements and trailers, and meeting with developers to discuss how to reveal their games; he spent July and August meeting with distribution partners in China and visiting ten game studios (including FromSoftware, Kojima Productions, and PlatinumGames) in Japan, followed by some time in Europe. He visited Rockstar Games's New York headquarters in September to discuss how to represent Red Dead Redemption 2 at the show.

The core team working on the show throughout the year consists of four or five people. The budget for 2018, determined in July, was several million dollars; Keighley personally funded the show while raising money from publishers and sponsors. Concepts were being considered by August, including the involvement of Hans Zimmer, who was originally involved in the previous show but dropped out due to other commitments. Keighley began to book presenters in October, having secured developers such as Josef Fares and Jeff Kaplan by mid-month; he spoke to Peter Jackson about a collaboration but it fell through. For the 2018 ceremony, the production team focused on stage lighting for immersion. Once the team approved Bennett's designs in September, they turned to the budgeting phase, where ideas were often cut. In late October, eleven members of the production team moved into a four-building office complex in Santa Monica, transitioning from virtual meetings; hundreds of people ultimately contributed to the production by December.

Keighley estimated he worked on the show for around 18 hours each day from August to November, and 19 hours for the final month. Kim felt she had a yin and yang dynamic with Keighley. She worried he would spend too much time concerned about minute details; Keighley agreed, noting he enjoyed the work and does not regret it but wanted to employ more people in future to shift his focus. Kim aimed for the show to be around 80 or 90 percent completed before Thanksgiving in November, when the team took a week off. To maintain secrecy, a security crew supervised rehearsals. Keighley kept secrets from his team and senior production members only learned of some announcements in the days before the show; trailers were only listed under code names with expected durations. Keighley wrote most of his own scripts, while Gabe Uhr and Kyle Bosman wrote for the presenters. During rehearsals, Keighley remained close to the Microsoft Theater by staying at the Ritz Carlton hotel across the street.

The show was held at the Microsoft Theater in Los Angeles on December 6, 2018. It was live streamed globally across more than 45 digital services. Tencent's Stephen Ma joined the awards as an advisor; the ceremony was live on more than 15 platforms in China. The ceremony began with a group speech by Nintendo's Reggie Fils-Aimé, PlayStation's Shawn Layden, and Xbox's Phil Spencer. Keighley had wanted to gather the three leaders since the show's inception in 2014 as he felt it was a metaphor for bringing the industry together. While all three leaders personally agreed to the speech, it took several months of negotiations before confirmation; Keighley felt it had "fallen apart" in the days before the show but "magically it came back together" in time. The Game Awards Orchestra opened the show with its new theme song, an original composition by its conductor Lorne Balfe, who had worked with Keighley on the Spike Video Game Awards. He wrote the piece to represent Keighley's work and the general gaming community. Balfe suggested Zimmer and Harry Gregson-Williams perform alongside Celeste composer Lena Raine and Anthem composer Sarah Schachner to illustrate the industries of film, television, and video games combined. Schachner worried how Anthems score would translate to an orchestral performance but, after arranging a shortened version of the game's theme, found "it started falling into place". For the Game of the Year medley, Balfe was forced to wait until the nominees were determined in mid-November; immediately after the announcement, the production team began contacting studios for the game soundtracks.

Announcements 
During the event, sales on some nominated and previously-winning games were held on the Nintendo eShop, PlayStation Store, Steam, and Xbox Games Store. Announcements on recently released and upcoming games were made for:

 Ancestors: The Humankind Odyssey
 Anthem
 Dauntless
 Dead by Daylight
 Devil May Cry 5
 Fortnite
 Forza Horizon 4
 Magic: The Gathering Arena
 PlayerUnknown's Battlegrounds
 Psychonauts 2
 Rage 2
 Rocket League
 Super Smash Bros. Ultimate
 The Stanley Parable

New games announced during the ceremony included:

 Among Trees
 Atlas
 Crash Team Racing Nitro-Fueled
 Dragon Age 4
 Far Cry New Dawn
 Hades
 Journey to the Savage Planet
 The Last Campfire
 Marvel Ultimate Alliance 3: The Black Order
 Mortal Kombat 11
 The Outer Worlds
 The Pathless
 Sayonara Wild Hearts
 Scavengers
 Stranger Things 3: The Game
 Survived By

Keighley was contacted by Supergiant Games's Greg Kasavin and Amir Rao after the 2017 ceremony; they met at the D.I.C.E. Summit in February 2018 and pitched the reveal and early access launch of Hades. The Mortal Kombat 11 reveal was in the works for almost a year. The developers of The Last Night were in contact with Keighley to show the game but were forced to pull out a month or two prior due to a publisher dispute.

Winners and nominees 

The nominees for The Game Awards 2018 were announced on November 13, 2018; the announcement received more traffic than anticipated, with five times more visitors than usual, crashing the website for several hours. Any game released on or before November 16, 2018 was eligible for consideration. The nominees were compiled by a jury panel with members from 69 media outlets globally. Winners were determined between the jury (90 percent) and public votes (10 percent); the latter was held via the official website and on social media platforms and technologies such as Amazon Alexa, Bilibili, Discord, Facebook Messenger, Google Assistant, and Twitter. Votes held on the official website and shared on social media were given an additional 10 percent weighting in the fan vote calculation. More than 10.5 million votes were registered, a 50 percent increase over the previous year.

The Trending Gamer award from previous shows was effectively split into two: Content Creator of the Year for those creating new and innovative video game content, such as live streamers and video creators; and the Global Gaming Citizens program, to recognize honorees improving their communities through video games. Additional esports awards were added for the 2018 show. Submissions for Best Student Game were open in September and October. They were judged by a panel of industry members including Jenova Chen, Todd Howard, Hideo Kojima, and Vince Zampella.

Awards 
Winners are listed first, highlighted in boldface, and indicated with a double dagger.

Video games

Esports and creators

Honorary awards

Games with multiple nominations and awards

Multiple nominations 
God of War and Red Dead Redemption 2 both received eight nominations each, the most in the show's history at the time. Other games with multiple nominations included Marvel's Spider-Man with seven, and Assassin's Creed Odyssey, Celeste, and Fortnite with four each. Sony Interactive Entertainment had 20 total nominations, more than any other publisher, followed by Rockstar Games with eight and Square Enix and Ubisoft with seven each.

Multiple awards 
Red Dead Redemption 2 received the most awards with four wins, tying for the highest-awarded game in the show's history to date. God of War won three awards, while Celeste and Fortnite won two. Rockstar Games and Sony Interactive Entertainment were the most successful publishers, with four wins each, while Epic Games and Maddy Makes Games won two.

Presenters and performers

Presenters 

The following individuals, listed in order of appearance, presented awards or introduced trailers. All other awards were presented by Keighley. Aisha Tyler was announced as a presenter but she was forced to drop out to film for Criminal Minds.

Performers 

The following individuals or groups performed musical numbers.

Reception

Nominees 

VentureBeats Dean Takahashi felt the nominations success of God of War and Red Dead Redemption 2 demonstrated "the power of long development cycles with huge teams"; the games took seven and eight years to develop, respectively. BBC's Louise Blain found the amount of single-player nominees "refreshing" following discussions of ongoing games being the future of the industry. Some journalists were pleasantly surprised by Celestes Game of the Year nomination. Den of Geeks Matthew Byrd observed a lack of variety in the nominees but considered them all high quality; he described Best Independent Game as "a stacked category" though noted Celeste was guaranteed to win due to its Game of the Year nomination.

Ceremony 
Several journalists highlighted the shared speech of Fils-Aimé, Layden, and Spencer as a highlight of the ceremony; Destructoids Chris Hinton wrote it "absolutely bolstered the image of The Game Awards". VentureBeats Takahashi praised the show for its surprises and wrote it demonstrates "gaming's bright future". He was pleasantly surprised by God of Wars Game of the Year win, though noted he personally voted for Red Dead Redemption 2, and said his favorite moment was Christopher Judge imitating his performance as Kratos on stage to Sunny Suljic, who portrayed Kratos's son Atreus. Push Squares Sammy Barker wrote the show was "very close" to hitting its ceiling and praised the blend of celebration and announcements.

Shacknews staff found the show an improvement over previous years, particularly in its presentation and professionalism, though God of Wars win polarized the crew. Kotakus Heather Alexandra found SonicFox's acceptance speech among the most heartfelt moments of the show. Destructoids CJ Andriessen criticized the show's heavier focus on announcements than awards, noting trailers received more screen time than winners. The Verges Megan Farokhmanesh highlighted the show's problematic winners, such as Ninja's use of racial expletives and refusal to stream with women and Red Dead Redemption 2s use of crunch practices.

Viewership 
The Game Awards 2018 was the most-viewed ceremony to date. Over 26.2 million streams were used to view the show, an increase of 128 percent from the 2017 ceremony's 11.5 million. At its peak, the show had over four million concurrent viewers, including 1.13 million on Twitch. The stream on Twitter had 1.3 times as many unique viewers as the previous year. The show was the top worldwide trend on Twitter; the use of the hashtag #TheGameAwards increased 1.6 times over the previous show, and the overall conversation increased 1.9 times. On Weibo, the 310,000 unique posts related to the awards received more than 56 million views. Over 3,300 Twitch users co-streamed the show, an increase of 140 percent.

Notes

References

External links 

The Game Awards ceremonies
2018 awards in the United States
2018 in Los Angeles
2018 in video gaming
2018 video game awards
December 2018 events in the United States